The series Africa & Asia: Göteborg Working Papers on Asian and African Languages and Literatures aims to cover any aspect relevant to the study of Asian and African languages and literatures. The journal appears annually.

External links 
 https://web.archive.org/web/20090922095026/http://www.african.gu.se/aa/contents.html

Open access journals
Linguistics journals
Literary magazines published in Sweden
University of Gothenburg
Annual journals
Mass media in Gothenburg